Friedrich August Elsasser (1810-1845), a painter of landscapes and architectural views, was born at Berlin and studied at the Academy of that city under Blechen, whose influence on art was at that time very great. In 1831 he went to Italy, and in 1834 and 1835 he visited Sicily.

Among his choicest works are: The Forest of Calabria, The Interior of a Church at Palermo, A View of the Ruins at Rome, etc. The King of Prussia sent him the Order of the Red Eagle, and granted him a pension for life, which he did not long enjoy, as he died at Rome in 1845. His brothers, Heinrich and Julius Elsasser, were also landscape painters. The latter was born at Berlin in 1816 and died at Rome in 1859.

Works
Palermo
Lago dei Nemi
Campo santo bei Pisa im Mondlicht
Sibyllengrotte in Tivoli
Klostergang in Cefalu
Innere der beleuchteten Peterskirche
Theater von Taormina

See also
 List of German painters

References

External links

1810 births
1845 deaths
19th-century German painters
19th-century German male artists
German male painters
Artists from Berlin
Prussian Academy of Arts alumni